Krzysztof Stanisław Gawara (born 15 March 1958) is a former Polish football player and former manager of Legia Warsaw.

Playing career
The first years of his career were spent in Bydgoszcz and Gdansk where Gawara graduated from Polonia Bydgoszcz, also defended the colors Zawisza and Lechia, where in 1983 he moved to Ruch Chorzow . As a player, he debut in the first league during his stay. After several seasons spent in Silesia, he moved to Legia Warsaw, where Legia won the Polish Championship twice in 1985 and 1986. Since 1988, he has played abroad, first in the Polonia Club of Sydney, and then in Finland FF Jaro and Tampereen Pallo-Veikot, which in 1994 won the championship of Finland, and finishing his career in EuPa Eura.

Coaching career
After returning from Finland, he began working as a trainer. The first club in his career he coached was Wicher Kobyłka, and after he moved to Legia. In Warsaw, he spent the next several years, training among the reserves. After his release in March 2001 Franciszek Smuda, Gawara was a temporary first-team coach of Legia, after which he became assistant Okuka Dragomir . After two years of the reserves, he returned to first team as an assistant Dariusz Kubicki. After his resignation in the autumn of 2004, he became part of a temporary trio of trainers, alongside Lucian Brychczy and Jacek Zielinski . Shortly after, after taking the latter's function of the first coach Gawara was his assistant. Then again worked in Legia II, and since the summer of 2006 is the caretaker at Huragan Wołomin.

External links
 Profile on legia.net
 

People from Jaworzno
1958 births
Living people
Polish footballers
Ekstraklasa players
Veikkausliiga players
Legia Warsaw players
Lechia Gdańsk players
Ruch Chorzów players
Polish football managers
Legia Warsaw managers
Sportspeople from Silesian Voivodeship
Association football defenders
Polish expatriate footballers
Expatriate footballers in Finland
FF Jaro players
Tampereen Pallo-Veikot players